Gibberula is a genus of minute sea snail, a marine gastropod mollusk or micromollusk in the family Cystiscidae, previously placed in the family Marginellidae, the margin shells or marginellids.

(Note: Gastropod taxonomy has been in flux for many years. This is especially true currently, because of new research in molecular phylogeny. Because of all this ongoing change, different reliable sources can yield very different classifications, especially within certain poorly understood groups.)

Other genus-group names are available for small shells resembling Gibberula. These include Granula Jousseaume, 1875 and Kogomea Habe, 1951. They are distinguished from Gibberula only on the basis of smaller size and other rather tenuous conchological differentiations.

Shell description 
The shell of this genus is 1.5 to 10 mm in length, ovoid, stout, with a small, low spire. The outer lip is thickened but without an external varix. It is usually denticulated inside. The columella has several plaits on a thickened rim, decreasing in size towards the posterior end. The siphonal canal is distinctly notched.

Animal

Head and foot
The head is deeply divided in two. There are two short cephalic tentacles and two small anterior lobes. The eyes are a short distance behinde the tentacles. The mouth is provided with an extensible proboscis.
The foot is only slightly longer than the shell when extended. In some species, the sole lies flat on the substrate when the animal is crawling. Others have the edge of the propodium raised, developed as parapodia which fit the head/tentacles in the manner of many tectibranchs.

Color pattern of the head and foot is a useful taxonomic character in all the species.

Mantle 
The mantle does not extend over the shell during normal activity. A tongue shaped, translucent lobe may be seen on the left side in some instances.
The internal mantle is usually visible through the shell. It may be brightly coloured in the smaller species with a featureless, translucent shell, and its pattern is then continued into the spire over the visceral mass.
The siphon is short and inconspicuous, often bordered by a small pad.

Reproduction 
All species of marginellids have a direct development without a planktonic phase.

Species 
The separation between the genera Persicula and Gibberula is not clearcut and currently follows a rather arbitrary criterion where the large species with (usually with complex colour pattern) are placed in Persicula and the smaller species with a banded or uniform colour pattern in Gibberula, leaving in between many ambiguous species. To date (2010) there is no phylogenetic analysis behind the current generic placements.

Gibberula ablita (Laseron, 1957)
Gibberula abyssicola Monterosato in Locard, 1897
Gibberula achenea Roth & Coan, 1971
 Gibberula adyae Espinosa & Ortea, 2019
 Gibberula adzubae Ortea, 2015
Gibberula aequatorialis Thiele, 1925
Gibberula agapeta Watson, 1886
Gibberula agricola Faber, 2005
 Gibberula ahuiri Cossignani, 2020
Gibberula albotriangularis Rolán & Fernandes, 1997
Gibberula aldridgei Usticke, 1969
Gibberula almadiensis Pin & Boyer, 1995
Gibberula almo Bartsch, 1915
 † Gibberula amurakucensis Pacaud, 2019 
 Gibberula andreahirundae Cossignani & Lorenz, 2019
 Gibberula angelarum Cossignani & Lorenz, 2018
Gibberula aperta McCleery, 2008
 † Gibberula aquitanensis Lozouet, 1998 
Gibberula ardovinii Cossignani, 2006
Gibberula arubagrandis McCleery, 2008
Gibberula asellina Jousseaume, 1875
Gibberula atlantidea Knudsen, 1956
 Gibberula atwoodae Ortea, 2015
Gibberula audreyae Cossignani, 2006
Gibberula aurata Bavay, 1913
 Gibberula aurelieae Ortea, 2017
 Gibberula ayzae Ortea & Moro, 2020
Gibberula baisrei Espinosa & Ortea, 2007
Gibberula belizensis McCleery, 2008
Gibberula benguelensis Jousseaume, 1875
Gibberula bensoni (Reeve, 1865)
Gibberula benyi Espinosa & Ortea, 2007
 Gibberula betancourtae Ortea, 2015
 Gibberula boettgeri (Maltzan, 1884)
 Gibberula borbonica Boyer, 2014
 † Gibberula bezoyensis Lozouet, 2019
 Gibberula boulmerkae Ortea, 2015
Gibberula boyeri Cossignani, 2006
 Gibberula bozzettii Cossignani & Lorenz, 2020
 Gibberula bozzettii Cossignani & Lorenz, 2020
Gibberula bribri Espinosa y Ortea, 2000
Gibberula bulbosa Reeve, 1865
Gibberula burnupi Sowerby III, 1897
Gibberula caelata (Monterosato, 1897)
Gibberula candida Cossignani, 2008
Gibberula caribetica Espinosa and Ortea, 2002
 Gibberula cavernicola Espinosa & Ortea, 2007
 Gibberula cavinae Cossignani & Perugia, 2010
 Gibberula ceciliae Espinosa & Ortea, 2019
Gibberula celerae McCleery, 2008
Gibberula cherubini (Bavay, 1922)
Gibberula chiarae Bozzetti & Cossignani, 2009
Gibberula chudeaui Bavay, 1910
 Gibberula chumi Espinosa & Ortea, 2019
Gibberula cincta Boyer, 2003
Gibberula colombiana Boyer, 2003
Gibberula columnella Bavay, 1913
Gibberula compressa Laseron, 1957
Gibberula conejoensis McCleery, 2008
Gibberula confusa Gofas, 1989
 † Gibberula constantinensis Le Renard & van Nieulande, 1985 
 † Gibberula cooperi Fehse & Wiese, 1992 
 Gibberula cozzii Ortea & Moro, 2020
Gibberula crassa McCleery, 2009
Gibberula cristata Gofas, 1989
Gibberula cristinae Tisselli, Agamennone & Giunchi, 2009
 Gibberula cristinae Ortea & Moro, 2020 (provisional name - homonym of Gibberula cristinae Tisselli, Agamennone & Giunchi, 2009)
Gibberula cucullata Gofas & Fernandes, 1987
Gibberula decorfasciata Rolán & Fernandes, 1997
 † Gibberula degrangei (Peyrot, 1928) 
 Gibberula delapazi Ortea & Moro, 2020
 Gibberula delarrochae Ortea, 2015
 Gibberula dennisi Ortea & Moro, 2020
Gibberula dens Reeve, 1865
 Gibberula denticulata Boyer, 2018
Gibberula diadema Pin & Boyer, 1995
Gibberula differens E. A. Smith, 1904
Gibberula diplostreptus May, 1916
 Gibberula dosmosquises Espinosa, Ortea & Caballer, 2011
Gibberula dulcis E. A. Smith, 1904
 † Gibberula eliopsis La Renard & van Nieulande, 1985 
Gibberula elisae Bozzetti & Cossignani, 2009
Gibberula eloinae Espinosa and Ortea, 2007
Gibberula elvirae Moreno, 2012
Gibberula encaustica Reeve, 1865 (taxon inquirendum)
Gibberula epigrus Reeve, 1865
 Gibberula estherae Ortea & Moro, 2017
 Gibberula eugeniae Espinosa & Ortea, 2019
Gibberula evadne Dall & Simpson, 1901
 Gibberula evandroi Ortea & Moro, 2018
Gibberula falsijaponica (Habe, 1961)
Gibberula farlensis McCleery, 2009
 Gibberula fatimae Ortea & Moro, 2018
Gibberula ficula Murdoch & Suter, 1906
Gibberula fortis McCleery, 2008
Gibberula fortisminor McCleery, 2008
Gibberula gabryae Bozzetti, 1993
 Gibberula garzae Espinosa & Ortea, 2019
Gibberula gironai Espinosa and Ortea, 2007
 Gibberula giulianae Cossignani & Lorenz, 2020
 Gibberula giulianae Cossignani & Lorenz, 2020
 Gibberula goodallae Ortea, 2015
Gibberula gradatim McCleery, 2008
 Gibberula grafae Ortea, 2015
Gibberula granulinaformis McCleery, 2008
Gibberula gruveli Bavay, 1913
Gibberula hardingae Dell, 1956
 Gibberula hendricksae Ortea, 2015
Gibberula hernandezi Contreras & Talavera, 1988
Gibberula hirami Espinosa and Ortea, 2007
Gibberula infundibulum Bozzetti, 1994
Gibberula inopinata Barnard, 1962
Gibberula insularum Roth & Coan, 1971
 Gibberula isinbayevae Ortea, 2015
Gibberula jansseni van Aartsen, Menkhorst & Gittenberger, 1984
 Gibberula japonica (Nomura & Hatai, 1940)
 Gibberula jayi Boyer, 2014
Gibberula jeanae Lussi & Smith, 1998
Gibberula jenphillipsi McCleery, 2008
Gibberula jorgefoyoi Espinosa and Ortea, 2007
 Gibberula lachryma (Reeve, 1865)
 Gibberula judithae Ortea & Moro, 2017
 Gibberula lacasito Ortea, Moro & Espinosa, 2020
 Gibberula lalaina Bozzetti, 2012
Gibberula langostera Espinosa and Ortea, 2007
 Gibberula laritzae Espinosa & Ortea, 2014
Gibberula lavalleeana (d'Orbigny, 1842)
 Gibberula laviuda Espinosa & Ortea, 2019
Gibberula lazaroi Contreras, 1992
 Gibberula leibovitzae Ortea, 2015
 Gibberula lessingae Ortea, 2015
Gibberula lifouana Crosse, 1871
 Gibberula linanprietoae Cossignani & Ahuir, 2020
Gibberula lorenziana Bozzetti, 1997
Gibberula louisae Bavay, 1913
Gibberula lucia Jousseaume, 1877
Gibberula luglii Cossignani, 2001
 Gibberula lutea Jousseaume, 1884
Gibberula macarioi Espinosa and Ortea, 2006
Gibberula macula McCleery, 2009
 Gibberula madbelono Ortea, 2017
 Gibberula maldiviana (T. Cossignani, 2001)
 Gibberula mamillata Boyer, 2014
Gibberula mandyi Espinosa and Ortea, 2006
 Gibberula manzanillera Espinosa & Ortea, 2019
 Gibberula mapipi Ortea, 2017
 Gibberula marcelae Espinosa & Ortea, 2019
Gibberula marinae Wakefield & McCleery, 2004
Gibberula marioi Espinosa and Ortea, 2000
Gibberula mariscali Espinosa and Ortea, 2007
 Gibberula martae Ortea & Moro, 2020
Gibberula martinae Cossignani, 2001
 Gibberula martingaiteae Ortea, 2015
Gibberula mazagonica Melvill, 1892
Gibberula mendacis Gofas, 1989
 Gibberula metoo Ortea & Moro, 2018
Gibberula miliaria (Linnaeus, 1758)
Gibberula mimetica Gofas, 1989
 Gibberula mirpuriolo Ortea, Moro & Espinosa, 2020
Gibberula modica Gofas & Fernandes, 1987
 Gibberula mooi Cossignani & Lorenz, 2020
Gibberula moscatellii Boyer, 2004
 Gibberula navratilovae Ortea, 2015
Gibberula nebulosa Boyer, 2002
Gibberula nilsi Espinosa and Ortea, 2007
 Gibberula norvisae Espinosa & Ortea, 2014
Gibberula novemprovincialis (Yokoyama, 1928)
 Gibberula nuryana Ortea & Moro, 2018
 Gibberula nussbaumae Ortea, 2015
Gibberula occidentalis McCleery, 2008
Gibberula olivai Espinosa and Ortea, 2006
Gibberula olivella Cossignani, 2001
 Gibberula omneiae Cossignani & Lorenz, 2020
Gibberula oriens McCleery, 2008
Gibberula oryza (Lamarck, 1822)
Gibberula ovata Habe, 1951
 Gibberula ovoides Boyer, 2017
Gibberula pacifica Pease, 1868
Gibberula palazzii Cossignani, 2001
Gibberula pallata Bavay, 1913
 Gibberula palmasola Espinosa, Ortea & Caballer, 2011
 Gibberula peterbonuttii Cossignani & Lorenz, 2018
Gibberula pascuana Rehder, 1980
Gibberula pfeifferi Faber, 2004
 Gibberula phantasma Espinosa & Ortea, 2019
Gibberula philippii (Monterosato, 1878)
 Gibberula pignonae Ortea, 2015
Gibberula poppei Cossignani, 2001
 † Gibberula prunicallosa La Renard & van Nieulande, 1985
 † Gibberula pruvosti La Renard & van Nieulande, 1985
 † Gibberula pseudoaquitanica Lozouet, 2019
Gibberula punctillum Gofas & Fernandes, 1987
Gibberula quadrifasciata (Marrat, 1873)
Gibberula quatrefortis McCleery, 2008
Gibberula ramsi Espinosa and Ortea, 2007
Gibberula raquelae Ortea & Moro, 2018
Gibberula rauli Fernandes, 1988
Gibberula recondita Monterosato, 1884
 Gibberula robinsonae Ortea, 2015
 Gibberula ronchinorum Bozzetti, 2017
Gibberula ros Reeve, 1865
 Gibberula rowlingae Ortea, 2015
Gibberula rufanensis (W. H. Turton, 1932)
 Gibberula sassenae Ortea, 2015
Gibberula sandwicensis (Pease, 1860)
Gibberula savignyi Issel, 1869
Gibberula scalarispira Bozzetti, 1997
Gibberula sebastiani Bozzetti, 1997
Gibberula secreta Monterosato, 1889
Gibberula sierrai Espinosa and Ortea, 2000
 Gibberula silviae Espinosa & Ortea, 2019
 Gibberula simii Cossignani & Lorenz, 2019
Gibberula simonae Smiriglio in Giannuzzi-Savelli et al., 2003
 Gibberula simplex (Laseron, 1957)
 Gibberula socoae Espinosa & Ortea, 2019
 Gibberula soniae Espinosa & Ortea, 2019
 Gibberula spiriplana (Jousseaume, 1882)
Gibberula squamosa Boyer, 2003
Gibberula stella McCleery, 2008
Gibberula striata Laseron, 1957
 † Gibberula subovulatoides Lozouet, 2019
Gibberula sueziensis Issel, 1869
Gibberula subbulbosa Tate, 1878
Gibberula subtrigona Carpenter, 1865
Gibberula tahaukuensis Cossignani, 2001
Gibberula tantula Gofas, 1989
 Gibberula teresitae Espinosa & Ortea, 2019
Gibberula themisae Espinosa and Ortea, 2007
 Gibberula thetisae Espinosa, Ortea & Caballer, 2011
 Gibberula thomensis (Tomlin, 1919)
 Gibberula turbinata Boyer, 2018
Gibberula turgidula (Locard & Caziot, 1900)
Gibberula ubitaensis Espinosa and Ortea, 2000
Gibberula ubitalta McCleery, 2009
 Gibberula valentinae Cossignani & Lorenz, 2020
 Gibberula valentinae Cossignani & Lorenz, 2020
 Gibberula varicosa Boyer, 2017
 Gibberula veilae Ortea, 2015
Gibberula velox McCleery, 2008
 Gibberula ventricosa Boyer, 2017
 Gibberula vermiglioi Cossignani & Ahuir, 2020
Gibberula vignali (Dautzenberg & Fischer, 1896)
Gibberula vitium McCleery, 2008
Gibberula vomoensis Wakefield & McCleery, 2004
 Gibberula watkinsae Ortea, 2015
Gibberula yidii Cossignani, 2006
 Gibberula yoshikoae Cossignani & Lorenz, 2019
 Gibberula zambranoae Ortea, 2015
Gibberula zonata Swainson, 1840

Taxa inquerenda
 Gibberula aldridgei (Nowell-Usticke, 1969) 
 Gibberula encaustica (Reeve, 1865) 
 Gibberula rolani Cossignani & Cecalupo, 2005
Species brought into synonymy
Gibberula bocasensis Olsson & McGinty, 1958: synonym of Plesiocystiscus bocasensis (Olsson & McGinty, 1958)
Gibberula jousseaumi Rochebrune, 1881: synonym of Volvarina sauliae (Sowerby II, 1846)
Gibberula rachmaninovi Kellner, 2003: synonym of Volvarina sauliae (Sowerby II, 1846)
Gibberula sandwicensis (Pease, 1860): synonym of Cystiscus sandwicensis (Pease, 1860)

References 

  1995 - Revision of the Supraspecific Classification of Marginelliform Gastropods. The Nautilus 109(2 & 3):43-110
  1999. Descripción de nuevas marginelas (Mollusca: Neogastropoda: Marginellidae) de Cuba y del Caribe de Costa Rica y Panamá. Avicennia 10/11:165-176.
 . 1987. Le Genre Gibberula (Marginellidae) en Mediterranee. Atti del II Congresso Societa Italiana di Malacologia. No. 23, 113-119
 . Expeditions Scientifiques du Travailleur et du Talisman. Tomo I
  1976. Type specimens of Mollusca in the collection of the Hebrew University of Jerusalem. Type specimens of recent Marginellidae. Basteria, Vol. 40, No. 1
  1998. Taxones publicados en Iberus (1981-1997). Iberus
  2000. 2000 - Marine Mollusks in Japan
 . Checklist of the Angolan marine molluscs. Reseñas Malacológicas X (June 1999)
  1973. A review of the Marginellidae described by Bavay, 1903-1922. The Veliger Vol. 16; No. 2: 207-215
  (2020). Descripción de nuevas especies de Gibberula Swainson, 1840 en las islas Canarias (Gastropoda: Cystiscidae), asociadas al proyecto de Ciencia Ciudadana de la RedPROMAR del Gobierno de Canarias. Avicennia. 26: 41-54.
page(s): 46, pls 5-6

 
Gastropod genera
Cystiscidae
Taxa named by William John Swainson
Taxonomy articles created by Polbot